André Ricardo Soares (born 9 October 1981), known as Andrezinho, is a Brazilian former professional footballer. Mainly a right-back, he was equally at ease on the left flank.

Club career
Andrezinho was born in Mineiros, Goiás. After playing for five teams in his country in six years, he moved in July 2007 to Portugal with Vitória SC, as the Guimarães-based club had just returned from the second division.

An undisputed starter from the very beginning, Andrezinho only missed one game en route to a final third place in the Primeira Liga, with the subsequent qualification to the UEFA Champions League. In the 2009–10 season he enjoyed his best year as a professional, scoring five goals in 25 matches – often from free kicks– as Vitória finished in sixth position, narrowly missing out on a UEFA Europa League spot.

In late July 2010, Andrezinho joined 1. FC Köln in Germany, penning a two-year contract and reuniting with former Guimarães teammate Pedro Geromel. However, coach Frank Schaefer saw no perspective for him in a reorganised team, and advised him to leave in the following transfer window.

References

External links

1981 births
Living people
Sportspeople from Goiás
Association football defenders
Brazilian footballers
Campeonato Brasileiro Série B players
São Raimundo Esporte Clube footballers
Vila Nova Futebol Clube players
Goiás Esporte Clube players
Coritiba Foot Ball Club players
Primeira Liga players
Vitória S.C. players
Bundesliga players
1. FC Köln players
Brazilian expatriate footballers
Expatriate footballers in Portugal
Expatriate footballers in Germany
Brazilian expatriate sportspeople in Portugal
Brazilian expatriate sportspeople in Germany